Paul Eugene Humphrey (July 18, 1917 – June 22, 2006) was an American football center who played professionally in the National Football League (NFL). He was drafted in the 11th round of the 1939 NFL Draft by the Philadelphia Eagles and played that season with the Brooklyn Dodgers. Later he played with the Milwaukee Chiefs of the American Football League.

References

External links
 

1917 births
2006 deaths
American football centers
Brooklyn Dodgers (NFL) players
Milwaukee Chiefs (AFL) players
Purdue Boilermakers football players
Sportspeople from Terre Haute, Indiana
Players of American football from Indiana